Alcidion apicalis is a species of longhorn beetles of the subfamily Lamiinae. It was described by Henry Walter Bates in 1864, and is known from Brazil.

References

Beetles described in 1864
Endemic fauna of Brazil
Alcidion